The 2018 European Championships were the first edition of the European Championships. It was a multi-sport event which took place in Berlin, Germany, and Glasgow, Scotland, United Kingdom (with Edinburgh hosting the diving events and Gleneagles the golf) from 2 to 12 August 2018. Around 1,500 athletes competed at the European Athletics Championships in Berlin, whilst at the same time more than 3,000 took part in the other championships in Glasgow. Each European Championship will be organised by the respective federation and host city.

Development and preparation

Venues 

Most of the events took place in Glasgow and its close surroundings:

 Tollcross International Swimming Centre – swimming
 Loch Lomond – open water swimming
 Scotstoun Sports Campus – synchronised swimming
 Sir Chris Hoy Velodrome – track cycling
 streets of Glasgow, East Dunbartonshire and Stirling – road cycling
 Cathkin Braes Mountain Bike Trails – mountain biking
 Glasgow BMX Centre (Knightswood) – BMX
 Strathclyde Country Park – rowing and triathlon
 SSE Hydro – artistic gymnastics

Two championships events were hosted at venues in different Scottish cities:

 Royal Commonwealth Pool, Edinburgh – diving
 PGA Centenary Course, Gleneagles – golf

The athletics championships event were held in the second major host city, Berlin

 Olympiastadion, Berlin – athletics

European Championships Trophy 
On 1 August 2018, at the "Great Big Opening Party" in Glasgow, a new European Championship Trophy was unveiled, to be awarded to the nation achieving the most gold medals across all seven sports during the Championships. It was presented by Katherine Grainger, Emma Fredh and Angelina Melnikova on behalf of the seven European federations involved in the event. On 12 August, the trophy was presented to the leading nation on the overall table, Russia, in a ceremony in Glasgow.

List of individual Championships

The following Championships have been brought together in the 2018 European Championships:

 2018 European Athletics Championships
 2018 European Aquatics Championships:
 2018 European Swimming Championships
 2018 European Diving Championships
 2018 European Synchronised Swimming Championships
 2018 European Open Water Swimming Championships
 2018 European Cycling Championships:
 2018 European Track Cycling Championships
 2018 European Road Cycling Championships
 2018 European Mountain Bike Championships
 2018 European BMX Championships
 2018 European Golf Team Championships
 2018 European Artistic Gymnastics Championships:
 2018 European Men's Artistic Gymnastics Championships
 2018 European Women's Artistic Gymnastics Championships
 2018 European Rowing Championships
 2018 European Triathlon Championships

Participating nations
52 nations, plus Authorised Neutral Athletes (Russian athletes competing in the European Athletics Championships under the European Athletics Flag) participated at the European Championships, including:

 Faroe Islands (FRO) (2)

 (hosts)

 (hosts)

 Macedonia (MKD) (2)

Schedule
The original schedule was released in February 2017. The schedule was updated in June 2017 based on the Glasgow ticket schedule and again in March 2018 when the Berlin timetable was released.

Medal table

Each sport maintained its own medal table, but an overall medal table is also maintained, the leader of which won the European Championship trophy. Russia won the inaugural trophy and topped the medal table by gold medals won with 31, whilst co-hosts Great Britain topped the total medals table with 74 medals, 26 of which were gold. A chasing pack consisting of Italy, the Netherlands, co-hosts Germany and France each won over 10 gold medals and 40 medals in total.

Notes
 Not included in the official medal table.

In addition, while both the Men's and Women's Gymnastics events included junior competitions in line with previous editions, medals in those competitions are not included within the total.

Results and Standings

Official results and standings ec2018results.com

Broadcasting

All of Europe's major free-to-air broadcasters televised the European Championships in 2018. The European Broadcasting Union, which holds the broadcast rights on all platforms, has confirmed coverage across the top five markets, BBC in the United Kingdom, ARD/ZDF in Germany, France Télévisions in France, RAI in Italy and TVE in Spain. Other EBU members already signed up include VRT (Belgium), HRT (Croatia), DR (Denmark), YLE (Finland), RTÉ (Ireland), NOS (Netherlands), NRK (Norway), TVP (Poland), RTP (Portugal), SRG SSR (Switzerland) and SVT (Sweden). The level of coverage is also enhanced by a deal with Eurosport. In total, over 40 EBU members have signed agreements as of April 2018. Discussions are ongoing with broadcasters in the remaining territories in Europe, plus other global territories like China, Japan and USA.

Sponsorship

Glasgow 2018 had five Official Partners (People Make Glasgow, Scottish Government, Strathmore Water, Spar & Eurovision) and Berlin 2018 had six Official Partners (Spar, Le Gruyère, Nike, Toyo Tires, Generali & Eurovision) with another tier of Official Supporters across the two host cities. Overall over 56 companies have been signed up to support the inaugural event.

References

External links

European Championships 2018 Results

 
European Championships
European Championships
European Championships
2018
European Championships, 2018
European Championships, 2018
European Championships, 2018
European Championships, 2018
European Championships
European Championships
European Championships, 2018